Fritz Usinger (5 March 1895 – 9 December 1982) was a German writer, poet, essayist, and translator. In 1946 he was awarded the Georg Büchner Prize by the German Academy for Language and Literature for his literary oeuvre.

Awards
Georg Büchner Prize 1946

References

External links
 Georg Büchner Prize at the German Academy for Language and Literature

People from Friedberg, Hesse
1895 births
1982 deaths
German male poets
20th-century German poets
20th-century German male writers